The Haardt is a range of wooded, sandstone hills in the state of Rhineland Palatinate in southwestern Germany.

References 

Hill ranges of Germany
Geography of the Palatinate (region)
Natural regions of the Palatinate Forest
Landscapes of Rhineland-Palatinate
Landforms of Rhineland-Palatinate